Ferenci, Ferenczi, or Ferenczy may refer to:

 Ferenci (surname), a Hungarian surname
 11584 Ferenczi, an asteroid
 Ferenci, Karlovac County, a village near Ozalj, Croatia
 Ferenci, Istria County, a village near Vižinada, Croatia